Pic de Nore transmitter is a facility for FM/TV transmission situated on the mountain of same name at 43°25'29"N   2°27'47"E, in the Montagne Noire, on the border of the Aude and Tarn departments, near to the Parc naturel régional du Haut-Languedoc in southern France.

It uses a 102 metres tall concrete tower. This tower replaces the old tower, which was situated on the roof of the transmitter building and whose pinnacle was torn down by a storm on December 2, 1976. The stump of the old tower still exists and is today used for mobile phone transmission.

External links 
 http://pagesperso-orange.fr/tvignaud/galerie/tv-fm/11pic-nore.htm

Towers in France
Transmitter sites in France